Fashion King Korea is a South Korean celebrity fashion survival program by SBS.

Eight celebrities will team up with the nation's top designers to compete with each other in fashion challenges and missions. Each week, the team with the lowest score will be eliminated. The competition will be screened by 100 fashion specialists.

The show began filming on October 2, 2013, and premiered on November 17, 2013.

Season 1
In the first season, the eight celebrities that participated in the show are Girls' Generation's Tiffany, SISTAR's Bora, Yoon Gun, Lee Ji-hoon, Kim Na-young, Boom, Lim Dong-wook and Cho Mi-rim.

The fashion designers were Park Yoon-jung, Lee Joo-young, Jung Doo-young, Ji Il-keun, Lee Ji-eun, Jang Hyung-chul, Nam Yoon-jae and Kim Hong-bum.

Teams

On February 2, 2014, Kim Na-young and her partner Jung Doo-young were declared the winners.

Season 2
The show was renewed for a second season and the first episode aired on August 16, 2014, with Shin Dong-yup as the host.

The celebrities participating in the second season are Jung Joon-young, Clara, Block B's Zico, P.O, Sunmi, ZE:A's Kwanghee, Yoon Jin-seo, Jo Se-ho and Hong Jin-kyung.

The designers that team up with the celebrities are Go Tae-yong, Choi Bum-suk, Han Sang-hyuk, Logan, Song Hye-myung, Kwak Hyun-joo, and Yang Hee-min.

Teams

References

Seoul Broadcasting System original programming
2013 South Korean television series debuts
Fashion-themed reality television series